Igor Benedejčič (born 28 July 1969) is a retired Slovenian football midfielder and manager.

Benedejčič was capped for the Slovenian national team. He scored the first ever goal for the Slovenian national team in 1992 in a match against Estonia.

International career
Igor Benedejčič was the first player ever to score for Slovenia in an international match. He scored the equaliser in their friendly against Estonia in Tallinn in 1992, a game which finished 1–1.

References

External links

PrvaLiga profile 

1969 births
Living people
Sportspeople from Koper
Slovenian footballers
Slovenian expatriate footballers
Slovenian expatriate sportspeople in Croatia
Expatriate footballers in Croatia
Association football midfielders
Slovenia international footballers
NK Olimpija Ljubljana (1945–2005) players
HNK Rijeka players
FC Koper players
Slovenian PrvaLiga players
Croatian Football League players
Slovenian football managers
NK IB 1975 Ljubljana managers
Slovenia national football team managers